Joaquín Alejandro Romo López (born 19 November 1999) is a Chilean footballer who plays for Palestino. recoleta fc chile

References

1999 births
Living people
Chilean footballers
Chilean Primera División players
Club Deportivo Palestino footballers
Association football midfielders